The Killock Shoal Light was a lighthouse located at the north end of the channel west of Chincoteague, Virginia.

History
This light was erected in 1886. It was unlike other screw-pile structures in the area, with the lantern set at one corner of a small square frame house.  It was automated in 1923, and decommissioned in 1939, with the house being replaced by a steel tower. The structure is now unlit.

References

Killock Shoal Light, from the Chesapeake Chapter of the United States Lighthouse Society

Lighthouses completed in 1886
Houses completed in 1886
Lighthouses in Virginia
Chincoteague, Virginia
Buildings and structures in Accomack County, Virginia